Conus inscriptus is a species of sea snail, a marine gastropod mollusk in the family Conidae, the cone snails and their allies.

Like all species within the genus Conus, these snails are predatory and venomous. They are capable of "stinging" humans, therefore live ones should be handled carefully or not at all.

Description
The size of an adult shell varies between 32 mm and 65 mm. The shell is rather solid, smooth, grooved towards the base. Its color is ash-white, with dark chestnut hieroglyphic characters, interrupted by revolving series of spots in the middle and at the base.

Distribution
This species occurs in the Red Sea and in the Indian Ocean off Madagascar and KwaZulu-Natal, South Africa; also found off Western Thailand and in the Aegean Sea (as an introduced alien)

References

 Smith, E. A. 1877. Description of a new species of Conus. Quarterly Journal of Conchology 1:202–204, 1 fig.
 Filmer R.M. (2001). A Catalogue of Nomenclature and Taxonomy in the Living Conidae 1758 – 1998. Backhuys Publishers, Leiden. 388pp.
 Tucker J.K. (2009). Recent cone species database. September 4, 2009 Edition
 Tucker J.K. & Tenorio M.J. (2009) Systematic classification of Recent and fossil conoidean gastropods. Hackenheim: Conchbooks. 296 pp
 Puillandre N., Duda T.F., Meyer C., Olivera B.M. & Bouchet P. (2015). One, four or 100 genera? A new classification of the cone snails. Journal of Molluscan Studies. 81: 1–23

External links
 The Conus Biodiversity website
 
 Cone Shells – Knights of the Sea

inscriptus
Gastropods described in 1843